The 2011 Malaysia Open Grand Prix Gold was the fifth Grand Prix's badminton tournament of the 2011 BWF Grand Prix Gold and Grand Prix. The tournament was held in Alor Setar, Malaysia on 3–8 May 2011 and had a total purse of $120,000. The tournament has moved from Johor Bahru, where its first two editions had been held.

Men's singles

Seeds

  Lee Chong Wei (champion)
  Taufik Hidayat (withdrew)
  Nguyen Tien Minh (semifinals)
  Chen Jin (third round)
  Simon Santoso (withdrew)
  Park Sung-hwan (quarterfinals)
  Bao Chunlai (final)
  Wong Choong Hann (first round)
  Lee Hyun-il (quarterfinals)
  Alamsyah Yunus (withdrew)
  Sho Sasaki (semifinals)
  Parupalli Kashyap (second round)
  Dionysius Hayom Rumbaka (first round)
  Son Wan-ho (third round)
  Tommy Sugiarto (third round)
  Kazushi Yamada (third round)

Finals

Top half

Section 1

Section 2

Section 3

Section 4

Bottom half

Section 5

Section 6

Section 7

Section 8

Women's singles

Seeds

  Saina Nehwal (final)
  Wang Xin (champion)
  Jiang Yanjiao (quarterfinals)
  Bae Yeon-ju (semifinals)
  Yip Pui Yin (withdrew)
  Eriko Hirose (second round)
  Sung Ji-hyun (semifinals)
  Yao Jie (first round)

Finals

Top half

Section 1

Section 2

Bottom half

Section 3

Section 4

Men's doubles

Seeds

  Koo Kien Keat / Tan Boon Heong (champion)
  Markis Kido / Hendra Setiawan (second round)
  Mohammad Ahsan / Bona Septano (quarterfinals)
  Alvent Yulianto Chandra / Hendra Aprida Gunawan (final)
  Hirokatsu Hashimoto / Noriyasu Hirata (quarterfinals)
  Hiroyuki Endo / Kenichi Hayakawa (quarterfinals)
  Naoki Kawamae / Shoji Sato (second round)
  Cho Gun-woo / Kwon Yi-goo (semifinals)

Finals

Top half

Section 1

Section 2

Bottom half

Section 3

Section 4

Women's doubles

Seeds

  Miyuki Maeda / Satoko Suetsuna (champion)
  Mizuki Fujii / Reika Kakiiwa (second round)
  Duanganong Aroonkesorn / Kunchala Voravichitchaikul (second round)
  Meiliana Jauhari / Greysia Polii (semifinals)
  Shizuka Matsuo / Mami Naito (final)
  Shinta Mulia Sari / Yao Lei (first round)
  Chin Eei Hui / Wong Pei Tty (second round)
  Lotte Jonathans / Paulien van Dooremalen (quarterfinals)

Finals

Top half

Section 1

Section 2

Bottom half

Section 3

Section 4

Mixed doubles

Seeds

  Sudket Prapakamol / Saralee Thoungthongkam (quarterfinals)
  Songphon Anugritayawon / Kunchala Voravichitchaikul (semifinals)
  Fran Kurniawan / Pia Zebadiah (semifinals)
  Tontowi Ahmad / Liliyana Natsir (champion)
  Shintaro Ikeda / Reiko Shiota (quarterfinals)
  Chan Peng Soon / Goh Liu Ying (final)
  Xu Chen / Ma Jin (first round)
  Muhammad Rijal / Debby Susanto (withdrew)

Finals

Top half

Section 1

Section 2

Bottom half

Section 3

Section 4

References

External links
 Tournament Link

Malaysia Masters
Malaysia
Malaysia Open Grand Prix Gold
Sport in Alor Setar